Markus Mustonen (born 1973) is a musician who played drums, keyboards, piano and sang backing vocals in the Swedish band Kent.

References 

1973 births
Living people
People from Eskilstuna
Swedish people of Finnish descent
Swedish male musicians
Swedish drummers
Kent (band) members